The Australia women's national under-16 and under-17 basketball team is a national basketball team of Australia and is governed by the Australian Basketball Federation Inc. It represents the country in international under-16 and under-17 (under age 16 and under age 17) women's basketball competitions.

Tournament record

World Cup
Australia participated in the inaugural FIBA Under-17 World Championship in 2010 in France. They have appeared in every edition since.

Statistics

Head coaches
  Shannon Seebohm - 2017
  Philip Brown - 2019-present

See also

Australia women's national basketball team
Australia women's national under-19 basketball team
Australia men's national under-17 basketball team

References

External links

National youth sports teams of Australia
Women's national under-17 basketball teams